Marissa Vosloo-Jacobs, born on 17 May 1976, is a stage actress.

Early life 

Vosloo-Jacobs was raised in Kroonstad. After matriculating from Afrikaanse Hoërskool in Kroontstad in 1994, she studied at the University of Pretoria and obtained a B.A (Drama) degree.

Personal life 

In November 2008 Marissa Vosloo and Hennie Jacobs, fell victim to a carjacking at a petrol station at Paulshof in northern Johannesburg. The hijacker threatened the couple using a 9mm pistol and stole their vehicle. Nobody was injured.

On Saturday, 6 December 2008, Jacobs and Vosloo were married in an African setting in a Shebeen-themed wedding. Their first daughter, Nua Audrey Esthe Jacobs, was born on 22 January 2010. Their second daughter, Tali Anah Ella Jacobs, was born on 14 March 2013.

Acting career

Stage

References

1976 births
Living people
University of Pretoria alumni
People from Pretoria